Norðtoftir is a small settlement on the Faroese island of Borðoy in the Hvannasund municipality. The 2020 population was 2. Its postal code is FO 736.

Norðtoftir is situated on the east coast of Borðoy at the end of the second tunnel on the road from Klaksvik. Larger settlements in the surroundings are Norðdepil and Hvannasund which can be reached continuing along the road. The Danish writer Herman Bang liked to spend time in Norðtoftir. He wrote many of his works here.

See also
 List of towns in the Faroe Islands

Populated places in the Faroe Islands